The 1896 Rhode Island gubernatorial election was held on April 1, 1896. Incumbent Republican Charles W. Lippitt defeated Democratic nominee George L. Littlefield with 56.40% of the vote.

General election

Candidates
Major party candidates
Charles W. Lippitt, Republican
George L. Littlefield, Democratic

Other candidates
Thomas H. Peabody, Prohibition
Edward W. Theinert, Socialist Labor
Henry A. Burlingame, People's

Results

References

1896
Rhode Island
Gubernatorial